LimaCorporate is a medical device company. Their product range includes Large Joint Primary and Revision Implants, Extremities and Fixation Solutions and dedicated Patient-Specific Prosthesis Division.

Headquartered in Italy, with over 1000 staff members and 3 production plants worldwide, LimaCorporate has established more than 25 direct subsidiaries in Europe, the US, Asia-Pacific, and Latin America. Combined with a network of distributors, LimaCorporate operates in nearly 50 countries.

In 2021, LimaCorporate was the first to deliver 3D printing to a hospital setting.

Both Italian production plants of LimaCorporate have been certified ISO 14001 - Environmental Management Systems in compliance with environmental standards on pollution and energy efficiency.

History
Engineer and entrepreneur, Carlo Leopoldo Lualdi, LimaCorporate's founder, began producing surgical instruments in 1945.

In 1953, Lualdi created the first helicopter prototype, relying solely on Italian ingenuity. Between then and the year 2000, Lima became one of the most important suppliers to the aerospace industry. Through the 1960s and 1980s, the core business expanded into the manufacturing of medical devices, specifically titanium orthopedic prostheses. In the 1990s, the company continued to focus on innovating orthopedics with the specific aim of broadening its presence on a global scale. In the year 2000, Lima made the decision to specialize exclusively in the production of orthopedic implants.

In the early 2000s, LimaCorporate began developing Electron Beam Melting (EBM) technology, a form of additive manufacturing, to address the functional limitations of the coatings applied to traditional prosthetic implants. In 2007, the company's first acetabular cup featuring TT, LimaCorporate's proprietary 3D printing technology, was developed and implanted for the first time in Italy.

Lima later announced the completion of a Distribution Agreement with OrthAlign, Inc. for a tibial/femoral handheld navigation device and associated instrumentation to be supplied within the European Economic Area (EEA) and Switzerland (excluding Romania).

In addition, the company announced the completion of an assets acquisition process with Zimmer Holdings Inc. on July 3, 2015. They acquired the Zimmer® Unicompartmental High Flex Knee (ZUK) and Biomet® elbow system for distribution within the European Economic Area (EEA), Switzerland and Japan as well as the Biomet® complete knee system for Denmark and Sweden. The agreement was approved by the Japanese Fair Trade Commission at the end of the same year.

In 2016, EQT, with Hansjörg Wyss as the co-investor, completed the acquisition process for a majority share of LimaCorporate.

In 2018, LimaCorporate acquired TechMah Medical LLC, a medical device software company located in Tennessee (USA), to offer digital applications that complement their hardware portfolio.

In 2019, LimaCorporate and the Hospital for Special Surgery (HSS) announced the foundation of the first additive manufacturing 3D printing facility for custom complex implants in a hospital setting. LimaCorporate announced the completion of a distribution agreement with G21 S.r.l. to supply cement spacer molds for the shoulder, hip and knee as well as antibiotic-loaded bone cement. Additionally, the company entered into an agreement with Dedienne Santé S.a.s. to distribute dual mobility acetabular cups in the European Economic Area (EEA) and Switzerland.

In 2020, LimaCorporate inaugurated new spaces entirely dedicated to 3D Printing and advanced testing at its HQ campus of San Daniele del Friuli, Udine, Italy. These new facilities include the Research & Innovation Center (R&I Center) and the Advanced Laboratory for Testing and Analysis (ATLAs). In the same year, LimaCorporate became the first Italian company to obtain the EU Quality Management System Certificate under Medical Devices Regulation (MDR) for Class III Custom-Made devices.

On March 24, 2021, LimaCorporate opened the ProMade PoC Center for Complex Orthopedic Solutions at the Hospital for Special Surgery (HSS), the first industry-owned and operated design and 3D printing center on hospital grounds. Located at the HSS main campus in New York City, the ProMade PoC (Point of Care) Center is LimaCorporate's first US-based, FDA-regulated commercial manufacturing facility delivering faster and more accessible care for U.S. patients requiring patient-specific solutions for their complex orthopedic conditions.

In 2022, LimaCorporate's Modular Shoulder System celebrates 20 years of (commercial) life. In January, Lima Canada officially opened as a legal entity. In February, the LimaCorporate Advanced Laboratory for Testing and Analysis (ATLAs) was accredited ISO 17025 by Accredia.

Products & technologies
Since 2007, LimaCorporate has been a pioneer in the 3D printing of standard and custom implants for orthopedic applications. They have conceived, produced and patented Trabecular Titanium technology, the next generation in additive manufacturing, and benefits from over ten years of clinical experience with 3D printed implants.

On the Digital front, LimaCorporate is developing Smart SPACE a 3D digital pre-operative and intra-operative surgical guidance platform which uses AI and machine learning to advance the platform digital suite supporting all algorithms behind LimaCorporate solutions.

Corporate governance

Since March 2016, LimaCorporate has been owned by EQT.

Founded in 1994, EQT is a purpose-driven global investment organization entirely focused on active ownership strategies, while responsibly investing in, owning, and developing companies.

The firm invests in private equity, infrastructure, real estate, growth equity, and venture capital in Europe, North America, and Asia Pacific.

As of March 2022, EQT's assets under management were EUR 90.0 billion.

LimaCorporate's advisory board includes Industry Experts who support the company's growth:

 Lars Rasmussen, chairperson of the Board
 Matteo Thun, Board Member
 Xavier Berling, Board Member
 Rodrigo Bianchi, Board Member
 Doug Kohrs, Board Member
 Eric Lohrer, Board Member
 Michel Orsinger, Board Member
 Petra Rumpf, Board Member

Since September 2022, Massimo Calafiore has held the role of CEO. Michele Marin has been the CFO since March 2018.

Recent acquisitions
2015
On July 3, 2015, LimaCorporate announced the completion of an assets acquisition process with Zimmer Holdings Inc.. They acquired the Zimmer® Unicompartmental High Flex Knee (ZUK) and Biomet® elbow system for distribution within the European Economic Area (EEA), Switzerland and Japan as well as the Biomet® complete knee system for Denmark and Sweden. The agreement was approved by the Japanese Fair Trade Commission at the end of the same year.

2018

In 2018, LimaCorporate acquired TechMah Medical LLC, a medical device software company located in Tennessee (USA), to offer digital applications that complement their hardware portfolio.

Awards
LimaCorporate's awards include:

 SMAU Innovation Award 2017
 Award for the Best Strategy for Capital Market Use in 2016-2017
 Diversity and Inclusion Award 2018

References

Companies based in Friuli-Venezia Giulia
Pharmaceutical companies of Italy
Pharmaceutical companies established in 1945